The Gravelines Nuclear Power Station is a nuclear power plant located near the commune of Gravelines in Nord, France, approximately  from Dunkerque and Calais. Its cooling water comes from the North Sea. The plant consists of 6 nuclear reactors of 900 MW each. In 2017 the plant produced 31.67 TWh of electric energy, 5.9% of French electricity production. Two reactors entered service in 1980, two in 1981, and two in 1985.

The site employs 1,680 regular employees. , it became the second nuclear station anywhere in the world to produce over one thousand terawatt-hours of electricity, following Bruce Nuclear Generating Station in Ontario, Canada, which passed that milestone in 2009.

The reactors of Units 5 and 6 were initially intended for export to Iran, but the order was cancelled after the Iranian Revolution in 1979. Their design, known as CPY, was the basis for the Chinese CPR-1000. An intermediate derivative is called the M310.

Incidents 

 In 2006 when Unit 3 was taken offline for routine refueling, it was discovered that an electrical wire had not been plugged in correctly during the last outage in 2005. This ranked Level-1 on the INES Scale, the lowest level on the 7-point scale
 In 2007, the plant experienced four separate events that qualified as Level-1 on the INES Scale.
 In August 2009, during the annual exchange of fuel bundles in Reactor-1, one bundle got stuck to the upper handling structure, stopping the operations and causing the evacuation and isolation of the reactor's building.

Cooling water 

The cooling water that carries waste heat from the plant is used for aquaculture in a location named Route De L'aquaculture.

A local commune of aquafarmers who raise European seabass and gilt-head breams. The warm water helps them grow faster.

Economics 

A major OVH datacentre is located next to the power station.

See also 

 List of largest power stations in the world
 List of nuclear power stations

References

External links 

 

Nuclear power stations in France